Max Grässli (4 March 1902 – 29 June 1985) was a Swiss diplomat. During World War II, Grässli was the Chargé d'Affaires ad interim of Switzerland, a member of the Swiss legation in Washington DC. In that capacity, he passed official communiques back and forth between the warring governments of the United States and Japan, including the Japanese announcement of 10 August 1945 regarding acceptance of the Potsdam Declaration.

Grässli was born in Werdenberg, Switzerland. In 1930, he began working for the Swiss Federal Department of Foreign Affairs at the legation in Paris.

After World War II, he served in the Swiss diplomatic missions to Japan, the USSR, Hungary, India, Thailand, and Sweden.

In 1966, he prepared a report on behalf of the United Nations on the economic significance of the Panama Canal.

References

Swiss diplomats
1902 births
1985 deaths
Swiss people of World War II
Swiss expatriates in the United States